The Girl's floor event final for the 2014 Summer Youth Olympics took place on the 24th of August at the Nanjing Olympic Sports Center Gymnasium.

Medalists

Qualification

The top eight gymnasts from qualification advanced into the final.

Final

Reserves
The following gymnasts were reserves for the floor final.

References

Gymnastics at the 2014 Summer Youth Olympics